Gotland Game Conference (GGC), previously known as the Gotland Game Awards, is an international conference, game exhibition and -competition for students. The event is held annually and marks the end of the academic year for the students at the Department of Game Design at Campus Gotland, Uppsala University. Here they can showcase everything that they have learned during the year to a jury consisting of professionals from the game development industry, the gaming press and academia.

History

The Department of Game Design on Gotland, Visby, has hosted a public event for displaying student projects since at least 2002. The event found a stable structure and was branded "Gotland Game Awards" in 2006 and re-branded "Gotland Game Conference" in 2011, when a presentation track was added and the event opened to public participation. In 2017 the GGC added an international summit for game educators — with the intention of annually gathering game educations from across the world to collaborate and share experiences.  

 Theme Park / Revive 2002
 Public exhibition 2004
 Gotland Game Convention 2006
 Gotland Game Awards 2007
 Gotland Game Awards 2008
 Gotland Game Awards 2009
 Gotland Game Awards 2010
 Gotland Game Conference 2011
 Gotland Game Conference 2012
 Gotland Game Conference 2013
 Gotland Game Conference 2014
 Gotland Game Conference 2015
 Gotland Game Conference 2016
 Gotland Game Conference 2017 + Game Educators Summit
 Gotland Game Conference 2018 + Game Educators Summit
 Gotland Game Conference 2019 + Game Educators Summit
 Gotland Game Conference 2020  + Game Educators Summit (cancelled due to the COVID-19 pandemic)

The event

The event can be seen as consisting of four separate parts (spanning over multiple days);

Public presentation of student projects to an international jury of developers, designers, academics, journalists etc.
Followed by The Gotland Game Conference + showfloor, where all student games are made available to the jury and general audience. 
The conference + show floor is roughly modeled after the Game Developers Conference, but features only a single track of lectures.
The Award Ceremony
The GGC Party where students, jury and faculty celebrate their work and end of the school year.

Game Awards 
The Department of Game Design maintains a public database of all games and students that have been awarded at the Gotland Game Conference. It is not uncommon for students recognized at the GGC to go on and win other national- and international awards.

Game Awards (2018–)

 Best Presentation: Take My Shift
 Best Arcade Experience: Coal Rush
 Student Choice: Momentum Drift
 Alumni of the Year: Max Tiilikainen
 The Social Game Award: Twined
 Public Choice: Bench Warmers, Neon Nemesis (tie)
 The Almedalen Library Award: Symbio
 The Innovation Award: Nova Factor
 The Woke Award: Re Leap
 Expression in Game Design: Momentum Drift
 Jury Spotlight: Bolt and Bobby
 Jury Spotlight: Symbio

Game Awards (2006–2017)

People's Choice Awards

Special awards

Computer Animation Awards

Student Effort Awards

References

External links
Gotland Game Conference - Gotland Game Conference official website
Department of Game Design blog - the informal department blog 
Department of Game Design at Uppsala University - the formal department website
Campus Gotland
Facebook Page for Gotland Game Conference
 Mirjam Palosaari Eladhari blog about GGA
 Steven Milous blog
  Anders "Saint" Ekermo blog  -  Starbreeze Studios
 Dopefish blog - Starbreeze Studios

Video game awards
Video game festivals
Swedish awards
Video gaming in Sweden
2006 establishments in Sweden
Awards established in 2006